Inyo National Forest is a United States National Forest covering parts of the eastern Sierra Nevada of California and the White Mountains of California and Nevada. The forest hosts several superlatives, including Mount Whitney, the highest point in the contiguous United States; Boundary Peak, the highest point in Nevada; and the Ancient Bristlecone Pine Forest, which protects the oldest living trees in the world. The forest, encompassing much of the Owens Valley, was established by Theodore Roosevelt as a way of sectioning off land to accommodate the Los Angeles Aqueduct project in 1907, making the Inyo National Forest one of the least wooded forests in the U.S. National Forest system.

Geography
It stretches from the eastern side of Yosemite to south of Sequoia National Park. Geographically it is split in two, one on each side of the Long Valley Caldera and Owens Valley.

The John Muir Wilderness is a part of the Inyo National Forest and abuts Sequoia and Kings Canyon National Park along the crest of the Sierra. The northern part of the Inyo National Forest is preserved as a part of the Ansel Adams Wilderness area, which borders Yosemite National Park.

The Inyo National Forest was named after Inyo County, California, in which much of the forest resides. The name "Inyo" comes from a Native American word meaning "dwelling place of the great spirit".

The forest spans parts of Inyo, Mono, Tulare, Fresno and Madera counties in California, and Esmeralda and Mineral counties in Nevada.

The forest's headquarters are in Bishop, California, with ranger district offices in Bishop, Lee Vining, Lone Pine, and Mammoth Lakes. The forest was established on May 25, 1907. On July 1, 1945, land from the former Mono National Forest was added.

Wilderness areas
There are nine wilderness areas lying within Inyo NF that are part of the National Wilderness Preservation System. Some of these extend into other National Forests, as indicated:
 Ansel Adams Wilderness (mostly in Sierra NF and partly in Devils Postpile NM)
 Boundary Peak Wilderness
 Golden Trout Wilderness (partly in Sequoia National Forest)
 Hoover Wilderness (mostly in Toiyabe NF)
 Inyo Mountains Wilderness
 John Muir Wilderness (mostly in Sierra NF)
 Owens River Headwaters Wilderness
 South Sierra Wilderness (partly in Sequoia NF)
 White Mountains Wilderness

Ecology

The Inyo National Forest contains the Ancient Bristlecone Pine Forest, which protects specimens of Great Basin bristlecone pines (Pinus longaeva). One of these bristlecone pines is "Methuselah", the second oldest known non-clonal living tree on earth at more than 4,839 years old; the oldest known tree (discovered 2013) also lives in the park.

The forest also harbors an estimated  of old-growth forests. The most abundant trees in these forests are lodgepole pine (Pinus contorta) and Jeffrey pine (Pinus jeffreyi).

Filming location
Inyo National Forest was the site for Ride the High Country (1962) starring Randolph Scott and Joel McCrea, Nevada Smith (1966) starring Steve McQueen, Will Penny (1968) starring Charlton Heston, Joe Kidd (1972) and High Plains Drifter (1973) starring Clint Eastwood, as well as the sci-fi film Star Trek: Insurrection (1998).

Inyo National Forest also served as the filming location for the second half of the second episode in the BBC's Walking with Monsters (2005) documentary series, which was set in Early Permian Germany.

Destinations 

Popular within Inyo National Forest are:
 Ancient Bristlecone Pine Forest
 Convict Lake
 June Lake
 Lake Sabrina
 Lone Pine
 Mammoth Lakes
 Mono Lake
 Mono-Inyo Craters
 Mount Whitney
 Tioga Lake
 Tioga Pass
 Westgard Pass

See also 

 Devils Postpile National Monument
 Mono Lake
 Owens Valley
 Sierra Nevada (U.S.)
 White Mountains (California)

References

External links

 Inyo National Forest - U.S. Forest Service
 Inyo National Forest map - U.S. Forest Service

 
National Forests of California
National Forests of Nevada
Protected areas of Esmeralda County, Nevada
Protected areas of Inyo County, California
Protected areas of Madera County, California
Protected areas of Mineral County, Nevada
Protected areas of Mono County, California
Protected areas of the Great Basin
Protected areas of the Mojave Desert
Protected areas of the Sierra Nevada (United States)
Protected areas of Tulare County, California
Protected areas established in 1907
1907 establishments in California
1907 establishments in Nevada
California placenames of Native American origin